The World's Online Festival (WOLF) is a messaging and gaming platform with apps for iOS and Android. Users can create groups where they can send text, image, and short audio messages. Groups feature a Stage which provides five live microphone slots for users to chat. The app features a store where users can purchase in-app credits that can be used to buy additional features, utility chatbots and games, and to send in-app gifts to other users. Users have a reputation level that increases from actions such as playing chat games or purchasing credits.

WOLF is headquartered in London with branch office locations in Newcastle and London, UK, and Amman, Jordan. As of September 2014, the platform had 28 million registered accounts. Palringo offers a technology (Palringo Local) that allows users to establish and view the location of their peers by means of their manual position, GPS, triangulation or estimation on the internet network used at that moment. It uses the Google API Maps to show peer locations and also offers a "nearby" section in friends and group lists to show users who are nearby.

History

Palringo was developed by Martin Rosinski in 2006. In August 2006, Northstar Ventures invested £650,000.

 In 2010, Palringo launched an enterprise version of the app, offering companies private group communication networks.
 In August 2012, Palringo began a shift towards the consumer market. The current business model involves selling virtual products such as premium accounts, decorative profile stickers (called Charms), chat bots, and functional utilities.
 In May 2014, Palringo acquired Swedish games developer Free Lunch Design (FLD).
 In May 2015, Palringo acquired Finnish chat games developer Tribe Studios.
 In late 2019, Palringo introduced Stages, which allows up to five users to broadcast live audio within their chat group.
 In February 2020, Palringo officially re-branded to The World's Online Festival (WOLF).

Charity

In 2013, the company launched a charitable initiative aimed at their users in the Gulf region during the month of Ramadan, which enabled users to donate Palringo credits through a special charity Bot. Palringo users raised over US$230,000 for Charity Right and Islamic Relief. During Ramadan in 2015, Palringo raised more than $300,000 to be split between Action Against Hunger and Islamic Relief Worldwide.

References 

Android (operating system) software
IOS software
Symbian software
Instant messaging clients
2006 software